Robert Rex Hunt (born 1 October 1942) is an English former footballer who played as a forward in the Football League.

Career
Born in Colchester, Essex, Hunt began his career with hometown club Colchester United in 1959, where he made 149 league appearances, scoring 81 goals. He was signed by Northampton Town in 1964 where he spent two season, scoring 10 goals in 40 league appearances. Hunt holds the record for the most goals in a Football League season for the U's, notching up 39 goals in one campaign. He formed a partnership with Martyn King, the two strikers regularly scoring over 20 goals a season during their time with the club. In 2008, Hunt was inducted into the Colchester United Hall of Fame. He moved to Millwall in 1966, scoring 13 in 43 league games, before moving to Ipswich Town, with a record of just four goals in 26 appearances between 1968 and 1971, although he was part of the Second Division winning team of 1967–68. His next club was Charlton Athletic. During his time with Charlton, he scored 11 goals in 36 league games, and was also loaned to former club Northampton, where he scored three goals in five games. He left Charlton for Reading in 1973 where he spent one year, making 16 appearances and scoring three goals. He finished his career with Maidstone United.

Honours
Colchester United
 Football League Fourth Division Runner-up (1): 1961–62

Ipswich Town
 Football League Second Division Winner (1): 1967–68

Outside football
After retiring, Hunt worked in the commercial department at Colchester United.

Hunt stood as an independent candidate in the 2012 elections to Colchester Council. He campaigned against the Council's proposed closure of Joyce Brooks House, a sheltered housing complex he currently lives in. He reached second place in the polls, receiving 194 votes, but failed to overtake the Labour incumbent Tina Dopson, who was re-elected with 926 votes.

References

External links
Bobby Hunt's Career

1942 births
Living people
English footballers
Sportspeople from Colchester
Association football forwards
Charlton Athletic F.C. players
Colchester United F.C. players
Northampton Town F.C. players
Millwall F.C. players
Ipswich Town F.C. players
Reading F.C. players
Maidstone United F.C. (1897) players
English Football League players
Colchester United F.C. non-playing staff